Clemente Ruiz Nazario (November 23, 1896 in San Germán, Puerto Rico – December 25, 1969), was the first Puerto Rican appointed as District Judge to the United States District Court for the District of Puerto Rico.

Education and career
Ruiz Nazario served in 1921 as a Second Lieutenant in the United States Army Reserve. Was president of the Boys Scouts of America for the New York, New Jersey and Puerto Rico region. Went to University of Puerto Rico where he received his teacher certificate and  his law degree from the University of Puerto Rico School of Law.

Federal judicial service
He was appointed by President Harry S. Truman, in 1952. Setting a precedent, the appointment of Ruiz Nazario to the federal district court in Puerto Rico marked the beginning of an uninterrupted practice of appointing Puerto Rican men and women to that Court. Nominated as the next-to-last fixed-term judge in the District of Puerto Rico, he was joined by a second judge as Puerto Rico's federal caseload increased, Judge Hiram Rafael Cancio who, after Ruiz Nazario's resignation in December 1966, was appointed as Puerto Rico's first Article III lifetime federal judge. He died on December 25, 1969.

Legacy

The main Clemente Ruiz Nazario United States Courthouse in San Juan, Puerto Rico, adjacent to the Federico Degetau Federal Building is named after him.

See also

List of Hispanic/Latino American jurists
List of Puerto Ricans

References

Guillermo A. Baralt, History of the Federal Court in Puerto Rico: 1899-1999 (2004) (also published in Spanish as Historia del Tribunal Federal de Puerto Rico)

1896 births
1969 deaths
University of Puerto Rico alumni
People from San Germán, Puerto Rico
Judges of the United States District Court for the District of Puerto Rico
Puerto Rican judges
United States Article I federal judges appointed by Harry S. Truman
20th-century American judges
United States Army reservists
Hispanic and Latino American judges